Sarah Isabella McElligott (28 November 1883 – 8 February 1986) was a New Zealand cook and fruit-stall holder. She was born in Kawarau Gorge, Central Otago, New Zealand on 28 November 1883.

References

1883 births
1986 deaths
New Zealand centenarians
People from Otago
Women centenarians